Humayma also spelled Humeima and Humaima, is the modern name of ancient Hawara. Hawara was a trading post in southern Jordan that was founded by the Nabataean king Aretas III in the early first century BC. It is located 45 km to the south of the Nabataean capital Petra and 55 km to the north of the Red Sea port town of Aqaba.

History
Humeima was occupied from about 90 BC until the Early Islamic period, and has Nabataean, Roman, Byzantine and Islamic remains, including a Roman bath and fort, five Byzantine churches, and a qasr or fortified palace from the Umayyad Period.

Nabataean and Roman periods

The settlement was founded by Aretas III as a stop on the trade route from Petra to Gulf of Aqaba. During the Greco-Roman era, it was called "Auara", derived from "Hawara", which means "white" in Aramaic.

Abbasid period
The town was the home of the Abbasid, or Banu Abbas family, around AD 700, who eventually overthrew the Umayyad dynasty and took over the title of caliph, and as such it was the birthplace of the first three Abbasid caliphs: As-Saffah (r. 750–754), Al-Mansur (r. 754–775) and Al-Mahdi (r. 775–785). The family residence of the Abbasids was a large qasr a roughly square plan, approximately 61 by 50 m, with a recessed entrance facing east, and a large central court, arguably one of the so-called desert castles, of which very little remains today.

Climate
As rainfall is only 80 mm annually, an extensive water storage and irrigation works lies in the ruins.

Notable residents
Chronologically:
Abd-Allah ibn Muhammad ibn al-Hanafiyyah (died c. 716 in Humayma), an early Muslim jurist and narrator of hadith
Muhammad ibn Ali ibn Abdallah (c. 680 - c. 744), the progenitor of the Abbasid dynasty and a relative of Prophet Muhammad, born in Humayma
Sallamah Umm Abdallah, ancestor of Abbasid dynasty, mother of caliph al-Mansur and grandmother of Abbasid Caliph al-Mahdi.
Al-Mansur (714–775), the second Abbasid Caliph (r. 754–775), born at Humeima
As-Saffah (721/722–754), the first Abbasid Caliph (r. 750–754), born at Humeima
Al-Mahdi (744/45–785), the third Abbasid Caliph (r. 775–785), born at Humeima
Ja'far ibn al-Mansur, Abbasid prince, father of Abbasid princess and consort Zubaidah (766? – 831)

See also 
Desert castles

References

External Links
Photos of Humayma at the American Center of Research

Ruins in Jordan
Roman towns and cities in Jordan
Abbasid architecture